Riverview is a town in Escambia County, Alabama, United States. At the 2010 census the population was 184, up from 99 at the 2000 census.

Geography
Riverview is located in south-central Escambia County at  (31.058641, -87.056688), on the south side of the Conecuh River. Alabama State Route 41 passes through the town, leading north into Brewton and south  to the Florida state line.

Demographics

As of the census of 2000, there were 99 people, 43 households, and 30 families residing in the town. The racial makeup of the town was 93.94% White, 1.01% Black or African American, 1.01% Native American, 1.01% Pacific Islander, and 3.03% from two or more races. 2.02% of the population were Hispanic or Latino of any race.

There were 43 households, out of which 23.3% had children under the age of 18 living with them, 55.8% were married couples living together, 14.0% had a female householder with no husband present, and 30.2% were non-families. 23.3% of all households were made up of individuals, and 4.7% had someone living alone who was 65 years of age or older. The average household size was 2.30 and the average family size was 2.70.

In the town, the population was spread out, with 19.2% under the age of 18, 10.1% from 18 to 24, 25.3% from 25 to 44, 29.3% from 45 to 64, and 16.2% who were 65 years of age or older. The median age was 42 years. For every 100 females, there were 83.3 males. For every 100 females age 18 and over, there were 95.1 males.

The median income for a household in the town was $21,667, and the median income for a family was $22,083. Males had a median income of $26,250 versus $28,750 for females. The per capita income for the town was $13,783. There were 28.0% of families and 21.8% of the population living below the poverty line, including 15.4% of under eighteens and 10.5% of those over 64.

Education
Escambia County Public School System is the local school district.

See also

 List of towns in Alabama

References

External links

Towns in Escambia County, Alabama
Towns in Alabama